The Basketball competitions in the 2005 Summer Universiade were held in İzmir, Turkey.

Men's competition

Final standings

Women's competition

Final standings

External links
 
 

Basketball
2005
2005 in basketball
International basketball competitions hosted by Turkey
2005–06 in Turkish basketball